Saint-Benoît-du-Lac is a community of 43 people, part of the Memphrémagog Regional County Municipality in the Eastern Townships region of Quebec. It only comprises an abbey, a cheese making facility, and its immediate surrounding lands.

History
The name Saint-Benoît-du-Lac refers to Benedict of Nursia, founder of the Benedictines. The municipality was founded on March 16, 1939 by splitting away from the municipality of Austin.

Demographics

Population

Language
Mother tongue (2021)

See also 
 Saint Benedict Abbey, Quebec
 List of municipalities in Quebec

References

External links
 Official website

Municipalities in Quebec
Incorporated places in Estrie